Gyalrong people (Tibetan: རྒྱལ་རོང, Chinese:嘉绒), also called Jiarong, rGyalrong, are speakers of the Qiangic Gyalrong language who live in the southern part of Ngawa Tibetan and Qiang Autonomous Prefecture of Sichuan, China. They are also found in Danba County of Garze Prefecture. The word Gyalrong is an exo-ethnonym and loanword from the Tibetan word rGyal-mo tsha-wa rong.

The Gyalrong refer to themselves as Keru. During the Ming and Qing dynasties, Gyalrong were ruled by local Tusi (土司). In 1746, Slob Dpon, the Tusi of Greater Jinchuan,  was trying to unite tribes in Sichuan, forcing the Qing dynasty to launch campaigns to suppress them. After 1950, the People's Republic of China classified them as a sub-group of the Tibetan people.

Famous Gyalrong 
Sanggyai Yexe, communist official.
Sonom

Gyalrong kingdoms
Kingdom of Chakla (Dartsedo) 
Kingdom of Trokyap (Chuosi) (1912-1951) 
Chiefdom of Chuchen (Greater Jinchuan) 
Chiefdom of Tsanlha (Smaller Jinchuan) 
Four Northern Tusis (Situ): Zhuokeji (Cog Tse), Suomo (So Mang), Dangba and Songgong (rDzong gag)

References

Ethnic groups in China
Ngawa Tibetan and Qiang Autonomous Prefecture
Tibetan people